Fakhrabad (also Romanized as Fakhrābād; also known as Kalāteh-ye Fakhrābād) is a village in Sar Daq Rural District, Yunesi District, Bajestan County, Razavi Khorasan Province, Iran. At the 2006 census, its population was 1,672, in 429 families.

References 

Populated places in Bajestan County